Pumpkin Patch is a New Zealand childrenswear retailer. Established in 1990, it focuses on the design, marketing, retail and wholesale of children's clothing to customers in Australia and New Zealand.

History

Before receivership

The company was founded in New Zealand in 1990 as a mail order catalogue by Sally Synott. At its peak, the company was valued at over $NZ830 million and employed over 2,000 people. It operated over 180 stores across Australia and New Zealand, as well as in Asia, Ireland, the Middle East, South Africa, the United Kingdom and the United States.

In 2010, the company 48 stores around New Zealand, including 18 in Auckland.

In 2014, the firm began to experience declining revenues and margin compression due to competition.

By 2015, the company had helped raise $NZD600,000 for the children's medical charity Cure Kids.

In 2015, a Roy Morgan survey of Australian consumers identified Pumpkin Patch as having the best customer service in the children's clothing category. In the same year, it also received an award for customer service from Essential Baby Magazine for customer service.

Following receivership

In October 2016 the company was placed into receivership. The receivers closed seven New Zealand stores and 52 Australia stores.

In February 2017, all remaining retail stores closed following a three month fire sale.

in March 2017, the company was placed into liquidation.

In December 2017, Pumpkin Patch was acquired by Catch Group, and relaunched as an online store in both Australia and New Zealand.

In 2018 the company was bought by Alceon Group. Pumpkin Patch products became available through EziBuy, online and in physical stores, and there were plans for a full re-launch in 2019.

References

External links 
 

Clothing companies of New Zealand
Companies based in Auckland
Retail companies established in 1990
Companies that have entered administration in the United Kingdom
New Zealand companies established in 1990